Goddert is an Ortsgemeinde – a community belonging to a Verbandsgemeinde – in the Westerwaldkreis in Rhineland-Palatinate, Germany. It belongs to the Verbandsgemeinde of Selters, a kind of collective municipality. Its seat is in the like-named town.

Geography

History
In 1476, Goddert had its first documentary mention under the names Gonderode und Goderoth. In 1972, in the course of municipal restructuring, the Verbandsgemeinde of Selters, to which Goddert belongs, was founded.

Politics
The municipal council is made up of eight council members, as well as the honorary and presiding mayor (Ortsbürgermeister), who were elected in a municipal election on 7 June 2009.

Seat apportionment at community council:

Economy and infrastructure
Northwest of the community runs Bundesstraße 413 leading from Bendorf to Hachenburg. The nearest Autobahn interchange is Mogendorf on the A 3 (Cologne–Frankfurt). The nearest InterCityExpress stop is the railway station at Montabaur on the Cologne-Frankfurt high-speed rail line.

References

External links
Goddert in the collective municipality’s Web pages 

Municipalities in Rhineland-Palatinate
Westerwaldkreis